The Ohio State Buckeyes wrestling team represents the Ohio State University and competes in the Big Ten Conference of the NCAA Division I level. The Buckeyes host their home meets at the Covelli Center on Ohio State's campus.

The team is coached by two-time NCAA Division I All-American and two-time Big Ten Conference champion for the Iowa Hawkeyes Tom Ryan. In 2015, he led the team to their first NCAA team title, finishing as runner-ups in 2008, 2009, 2017, 2018 and 2019. Currently, the Buckeyes have had five consecutive top-three NCAA team finishes (seven overall) and eleven top-eight team finishes in the last twelve NCAA championships.

Current roster 2022-2023

Championships

Team championships

Individual championships

Season Records

Olympians

Notable Ohio State Buckeye wrestlers

 Mark Coleman – member of the UFC Hall of Fame, World silver medalist in freestyle wrestling, NCAA Champion at Ohio State
 Wayne Holmes – Olympian in Greco-Roman wrestling at 1972 Summer Olympics
 Myles Martin – NCAA Champion, two-time finalist and four-time All-American 
 Perry Martter – Olympic in freestyle wrestling at 1924 Summer Olympics
 Joseph McKenna – NCAA finalist and two-time All-American at Ohio State
 Kollin Moore – four-time NCAA All-American
 Tommy Rowlands – two-time NCAA Champion, three-time finalist and four-time All-American
 Kyle Snyder – Olympic gold medalist in freestyle wrestling at 2016 Summer Olympics and silver medalist in 2020, two-time World Champion, three-time NCAA Champion and four-time finalist
 Harry Steel – Olympic gold medalist in freestyle wrestling at 1924 Summer Olympics
 Logan Stieber – 2016 World Champion in freestyle wrestling, four-time NCAA Champion
 Nathan Tomasello – NCAA Champion and four-time All-American

References